The Central American Age Group Championships in Athletics (Campeonatos Centroamericanos Juvenil C y Infantil A) is an athletics event organized by the Confederación Atlética del Istmo Centroamericano CADICA (Central American Isthmus Athletic Confederation) open for athletes from member associations.  The event is divided into the Junior C (U-16) Central American Championships and the Infantile A (U-14) Central American Championships. The Junior C category is open for girls and boys aged 14–15. The Infantile A category is open for girls and boys aged 12–13.  The competition started to be open for age groups U-14 (Spanish: Infantil A) and U-12 (Spanish: Infantil B) as Campeonatos Centroamericanos Infantil.  There is a report on an early competition held in the year 1984 in El Salvador.  At least from 1999 on, it is verified that the competition is held
annually.  In 2007, the format was changed to be open for the age groups U-16 and U-14, with U-12 competitions being held occasionally.  In 2012, a specific Central American "Kids Athletics" tournament (Spanish: Torneo Centroamericano Kids Athletics) was introduced for this age group (9–11 years).

Editions
The following list was compiled from the CADICA website, and from a variety of other websites and articles from the archives of different newspapers.

Campeonatos Centroamericanos Infantil

Campeonatos Centroamericanos Juvenil C y Infantil A

References

External links
CADICA website (in Spanish)

 
Under-18 athletics competitions
Age Group